Stenocranus is a genus of delphacid planthoppers in the family Delphacidae. There are more than 70 described species in Stenocranus.

Species
These 78 species belong to the genus Stenocranus:

 Stenocranus acutus Beamer, 1946
 Stenocranus agamopsyche Kirkaldy, 1906
 Stenocranus ajmerensis Joseph, 1964
 Stenocranus akashiensis Matsumura, 1935
 Stenocranus angustus Crawford, 1914
 Stenocranus anomalus Chen & Liang, 2005
 Stenocranus arundineus Metcalf, 1923
 Stenocranus bakeri Muir, 1917
 Stenocranus brunneus Beamer, 1946
 Stenocranus carolinensis Metcalf, 1954
 Stenocranus castaneus Ding, 1981
 Stenocranus chenzhouensis Ding, 1981
 Stenocranus cyperi Ding, 2006
 Stenocranus danjicus Kuoh, 1980
 Stenocranus delicatus Beamer, 1946
 Stenocranus distinctus Muir, 1929
 Stenocranus dorsalis (Fitch, 1851)
 Stenocranus elongatus Matsumura, 1935
 Stenocranus fallax Matsumura, 1935
 Stenocranus felti Van Duzee, 1910
 Stenocranus formosanus Matsumura, 1935
 Stenocranus fuscovittatus (Stål, 1858)
 Stenocranus gialovus Asche & Hoch, 1983
 Stenocranus harimensis Matsumura, 1935
 Stenocranus hokkaidoensis Metcalf, 1943
 Stenocranus hongtiaus Kuoh, 1980
 Stenocranus hopponis Matsumura, 1935
 Stenocranus japonicus Esaki, 1932
 Stenocranus jiangpuensis Ding, 2006
 Stenocranus koreanus Matsumura, 1935
 Stenocranus lautus Van Duzee, 1897
 Stenocranus linearis Ding, 1981
 Stenocranus linnapallidus Asche, 1985
 Stenocranus longicapitis Ding, 1981
 Stenocranus longipennis (Curtis, 1837)
 Stenocranus luteus Muir, 1917
 Stenocranus macromaculatus Ding, 2006
 Stenocranus maculipes (Berg, 1879)
 Stenocranus major (Kirschbaum, 1868)
 Stenocranus matsumurai Metcalf, 1943
 Stenocranus minutus (Fabricius, 1787)
 Stenocranus montanus Huang & Ding, 1980
 Stenocranus neopacificus Muir, 1917
 Stenocranus nigrocaudatus Ding, 1981
 Stenocranus nigrofrons Muir
 Stenocranus niisimai Matsumura, 1935
 Stenocranus ogasawarensis Matsumura, 1935
 Stenocranus oroba Fennah, 1975
 Stenocranus ozenumensis Ishihara, 1952
 Stenocranus pacificus Kirkaldy, 1907
 Stenocranus pallidus Beamer, 1946
 Stenocranus philippinensis Muir, 1917
 Stenocranus planus Yang, 1989
 Stenocranus polenor Fennah, 1975
 Stenocranus pseudopacificus Muir, 1916
 Stenocranus qiandainus Kuoh, 1980
 Stenocranus ramosus Beamer, 1946
 Stenocranus rufilinearis Kuoh, 1981
 Stenocranus sandersoni Beamer, 1946
 Stenocranus sapporensis Matsumura, 1935
 Stenocranus seminigrifrons Muir, 1923
 Stenocranus silvicola Vilbaste, 1968
 Stenocranus silvicolus Vilbaste, 1968
 Stenocranus similis Crawford, 1914
 Stenocranus spinosus Ding, 1994
 Stenocranus sukumonus Matsumura, 1935
 Stenocranus takasagonis Matsumura, 1935
 Stenocranus tamagawanus Matsumura, 1935
 Stenocranus tartareus Fennah, 1958
 Stenocranus tateyamanus Matsumura, 1935
 Stenocranus testaceaus Kuoh, 1981
 Stenocranus testaceus Ding, 1981
 Stenocranus tonghuaensis Ding, 2006
 Stenocranus unipunctatus (Provancher, 1872)
 Stenocranus vittatus (Stål, 1862)
 Stenocranus yasumatsui Ishihara, 1952
 Stenocranus yuanmaonus Kuoh, 1980
 Stenocranus zalantunensis Ding & Hu, 1994

References

Further reading

External links

 

Stenocraninae
Articles created by Qbugbot
Auchenorrhyncha genera